Juho Pirinen (born 2 November 1995) is a Finnish ice dancer. With his current partner, Yuka Orihara, he is the 2019–20 Finnish national champion.  With former partner Monica Lindfors he qualified to the free skate at the 2017 World Junior Championships.

Programs

With Orihara

With Lindfors

Competitive highlights
GP: Grand Prix; CS: Challenger Series

With Orihara

With Lindfors

References

External links
 
 

Finnish male ice dancers
1995 births
Living people
People from Lappeenranta